Ruyi Town is an urban town in Shaoshan City, Xiangtan City, Hunan Province, China.

Administrative division
The town is divided into ten villages and a community: Ruyi Community, Ruyi Village, Zongheyang Village, Qiushan Village, Shihu Village, Houluo Village, Meihu Village, Hengxin Village, Yangyun Village, Yangjia Village, and Houxin Village.

References

Historic township-level divisions of Shaoshan